Poniatowski (masculine; feminine: Poniatowska; plural: Poniatowscy) is a prominent Polish family. It may also refer to
Poniatowski (surname)
Poniatowski Bridge in Warsaw, Poland
Poniatowski, Wisconsin, an unincorporated community in the United States